Rodolfo Francisco Bobadilla Mata (16 October 1932 – 13 April 2019) was a Guatemalan Roman Catholic bishop.

Biography 
Bobadilla Mata born in Guatemala and was ordained to the priesthood in 1958. He served as bishop of the Apostolic Vicariate of El Petén, Guatemala, from 1987 to 1995. He served as bishop of the Roman Catholic Diocese of Huehuetenango, Guatemala, from 1996 to 2012.

Notes

1932 births
2019 deaths
Guatemalan Roman Catholic bishops
Roman Catholic bishops of Huehuetenango